World of Quest is a sci-fi comedy animated television series based on the graphic novel series of the same name by Jason T. Kruse. The series was produced by Cookie Jar Entertainment, in association with Teletoon and Kids' WB!. It appears to be a parody of the fantasy genre that blends swords, sorcery and technology, in the vein of Masters of the Universe. The show premiered on March 15, 2008, on Kids' WB on The CW in the U.S. and in Canada on Teletoon on August 10, 2008, as a preview, with regular airings starting on September 1, 2008. The CW4Kids removed it from its schedule after airing the first-season finale "Search For Power" on June 14, 2008. It's also the last series to be produced for the Kids' WB block.

Premise
The show that focuses on young Prince Nestor on a mission to save his parents, with his amazing muscled protector Quest by his side.

Characters

Heroes
 Quest: A strong, 1,900 year old warrior with an odd past. Previously, he was assigned as a nurse for baby Nestor. Quest first appears in Episode 1 when Prince Nestor arrives because his parents have been captured and he needs to find the Shatter Soul Sword so he can rescue them. Quest refuses until Nestor tricks him into activating an allegiance spell that binds him to the prince. His best-known catchphrase is mostly. "I hate..." 'e.g. theme songs, suckers, allegiance spell, etc.'
 Nestor: The Prince of Odyssea, son of the King and Queen of Odyssea, who have been captured. Even though he orders Quest around and calls him his "bodyguard", Quest usually ends up interpreting his orders to suit his needs.
 Graer: A thieving griffin with an appetite, Graer usually carries Anna Maht when traveling with the others. Originally he was Nestor's companion and seems to be old friends with Quest.
 Gatling: A cyborg with a slight British accent, Gatling first appeared in Episode 1.2, when Nestor, Quest and Graer travel to the town of Effluvium seeking him. Quest disliked Gatling because Gatling suggested to the queen that Quest be banished in lieu of execution. Gatling can chew bits of metal and spit them out like bullets, which comes in handy during a fight.
 Way: A shape-shifting female being with odd patterns on her body resembling circuits, Way always speaks in enigmatic riddles, although she is helpful. She has an intricate knowledge of the world of Odyssea, and often functions as both map and guide to Quest, Nestor, and company. She is found by Nestor in Episode 2.2 when they find the Dagger of Way. Way often travels inside the dagger later on.
 Anna Maht: A young sorceress, Anna has red hair and tattoos on her face and arms. She is a huge fan of Quest and adores the warrior, despite him not caring for her affections at all. Anna often boasts to be capable of casting a variety of spells, but they usually fail or have different results than intended. The one spell she can cast to great effect, though, is one that brings inanimate objects or plants to life. While these living tools often prove useful, they annoy Quest a great deal.
 Albert: A gigantic green creature resembling a cross between an armadillo and an ankylosaur with purple armor, Albert is used as a method of transportation by the team. Nestor and Quest usually travel in the 'mace' at the end of Albert's tail, which functions as a sort of cockpit. Albert can roll into a ball to escape hairy situations, but this leaves his passengers quite dazed. He is the only thing Quest likes and calls him the most important member of the group. He is over 73 feet tall.

Villains
 The Guardian - The one who protects the Shattersoul Sword, the Guardian is reawakened when Nestor brought the tooth (which held the five swords in it) to the tower and got shocked by  a green light. In another episode, he battles Egon, whom is then saved by Nestor who in turn loses the Fire Sword to the Guardian but realize they can "easily" (not really "easily") get the Earth and Air Sword from Lord Spite, but when they get there they find a sign that leads to the swords. Quest thinks it's a trap but they find the swords. However, when they go outside, they find The Guardian. Nestor tries to use the swords but finds out they're fake. In another episode, Quest challenges the Guardian to a duel for the Shattersoul Sword but loses and is forced to hand over Albert. However, Quest refuses to let his foe take his best friend and secretly hides underneath Albert while the Guardian unwittingly leads him to his lair, this leads to a second battle which Quest wins by smashing the Guardian's precious snow globe collection, giving him a massive advantage. The Guardian, however, refuses to surrender the Shattersoul Sword and they both run for it. During their struggle, the sword winds up splitting back into five and although Quest succeeds in taking some, the Guardian manages to get the rest. After the mountain incident, the race for the swords starts again.
 Lord Spite - The main villain of the show, "Lord Cornelius Evil Spite" ('Yes, "Evil" IS in fact his middle name!') is an evil overlord who has plans of world domination, but always fails due to his bumbling underlings as well as his own incompetence and cowardice. He looks vaguely reptilian with green skin and a large horn on his head. Spite has a flair for dramatics, and spends more time coming up with puns to use against Quest then on actual plans. Besides having a huge army of Growls and Grinders as well as commanding the living fortress of Mollox, he is a sorcerer of no small power and can also remove his right eye to use as a scrying ball. He plans to collect the Five Swords of Power and use them to release Shadowseed, he is also the one responsible for kidnapping Nestor's parents.
 Ogun - Spite's loyal Death Knight, Ogun was a former Rouster like Quest before turning evil. General Ogun turned evil because he felt unappreciated by the royal family, with the last straw being denied the title of Nestor's nanny, a position he wanted for a time. He wears armour resembling a skull with a skull-like head/helmet. The skull-like torso of the armour is actually alive. In one story, a tooth was chipped and it was restored by the following segment. Ogun often eats minions Lord Spite discards by sucking them into the black hole inside the mouth. No-one has demonstrated knowledge of where it leads, though on occasion people have come back from it. Ogun is loyal to Spite and harbours a great hatred for Quest.
 The Katastrophy Brothers: Khaos, Kalamity and Konfusion - Lord Spite's three henchmen: Khaos the Minotaur, Kalamity the Vulture, and Konfusion the Lizard. Whilst on their own, they are quite harmless, whenever they come in contact with water, the Katastrophy Brothers merge into a giant hybrid creature known as "Katastrophy"; the only way to change them back is to pull his plug (i.e. the ponytail in the back of his head). The three are quite useless, and normally rather try to shirk their duties and come up with explanations on why they could not capture the Prince to Lord Spite, or which one of them should be to blame for their failures, rather than even try. Khaos is the oldest and most sensible of the brothers, Kalamity is quite sarcastic, while Konfusion is notorious for being an idiot who never shuts up.
 Deceit - A witch in service to Lord Spite, Deceit hovers above the ground and has a hat with a living snake on it. Spite often summons her to help him in his plans to capture the swords, although Deceit (as she points out, it's in her name) has a tendency to double-cross him. Spite is always freaked out by her sudden appearances when she magically teleports in.

Creatures
 Grinders: Large, green, four-legged, rhino-like creatures with four eyes, one horn, and a huge mouth full of teeth, who can become alive if separated from their body.
 Growls: Small, grey, goblin-like creatures that run on two legs and have fangs, a Mohawk tuft of hair (colours may vary), and pierced ears.
 Sea Squawkers: Small critters with nasty-biting beaks that live in Quest's moat as well as in small ponds throughout Odyssea.
 Stumps: Sawed-off logs with arms and legs and glowing red eyes. They hurl balls of tree sap.
 Swampy Crabby Swamp Creatures: Large, green, crab-like creatures that live in the swamps that Quest and Nestor pass through. Graer likes the taste of them, especially with butter.
 Loberman Pinchers: Green, dog-like creatures with purple shells on their backs and scorpion tails with a big, pinching claw at the end.
 Lucky: Quest's tiny, but extremely vicious dog. It is a pure-bred, grinder-spaniel, really just a ball of green fur with a giant toothy mouth and four stick-like legs. He was given as a gift by Quest for Lord Spite. (Episode 107.1)
 Lipsuckers: Large, slug-like creatures with giant kissing lips. (Episode 107.2)
 Super Hopasaurus Rex: A cross between a Tyrannosaurus and a Kangaroo, bred by Spite to destroy Quest, but ends up treating Quest like a mother to a son. (Episode 107.2)
 Tremordites - Giant, horrible-smelling, sand worms that protect Dust Devil Ravine. They're totally blind and use the hair on their bodies to see. (Episode 108.2)
 Gatling's Adopted Mother: A half-cat/kangaroo woman with cat ears and whiskers, and a woman's chest and arms.
 Croc-a-Doodle-Doo A purple-coloured, troll-like creature with a tuft of hair protruding forwards from its forehead; the group tracks down this creature to learn how to activate the Earth Sword. (Episode 104.1)
 The Toe-Jamemers of the Fjord of Fowl Funky Fungus Fowl-Smelling Feet creatures that inhabit the Fjord. They also have serious problems with Foot Infections (particularly Athlete's Foot)
 Ding Bats Large, purple-coloured, bat-like creatures with long legs, big green eyes, and big fangs seen attacking a caravan holding Gatling's parents, Butt-headius, Amazing Claud, and a giant green furry hand. Quest uses Prince Nestor as bait for the Ding Bats in order to save the caravan after being told to 'make a distraction'.
 Suckers Small, insect-like creatures who prove hard to hit. They are blood-sucking, little flying scorpions, whose bodies are of a bluish colour, whom Gatling defeats by spraying with a can of what seems to be 'sucker-repellent'.
 Wall of Insults A mean, rock wall whom we can defeat by out-insulting. Gatling continuously insults the walls 'family' by calling them rubble, or something to that point. As it is insulting more and more, its face shrinks (like how Graer did when he was insulted several times by the talking wall) and eventually the wall crumbles allowing the crew to pass through where the wall once stood.
 Acorn A certain, greedy, acorn-looking for riches, who rats out on Quest and the others by telling Lord Spite where they are and where they're going. It basically looks like a giant acorn, but the darker brown bit at the top with the stem takes the same shape of a beret, and the creature's teeth are jagged and popping out of its mouth in all kinds of places. The acorn is soon destroyed by Ogun after informing Spite of Quest's whereabouts.
 Siamese Uberilla A giant, two-headed gorilla, both heads having one eye, giving it a sort of cyclops like appearance. A Siamese Uberilla is also the champion of the 'Grand Master', who Nestor and Quest, whose eyes where swollen from the horse-like guard's 'dander' fought to obtain the Fire Sword in the tournament of punishment.
 Mountain A mountain who is very much alive after being wide awake by Quest and his company. The grumpy old mountain seals up Quest, Nestor, Gatling, Ahna, Way, Graer, Spite, Ogun, Deceit, and the Guardian. They all split up and eventually end up escaping through the mountain's 'throat'. Unfortunately, the mountain gives one last boom and scatters all the five swords all over Odyssea.
 Craggy-Tongue Toe-Lickers Furry, green-winged creatures with large tongues and huge eyes. They also have small bird-like feet. Though they aren't actually seen at any time 'licking' anyone's toes, but at one point Graer mention that his toes feel 'ticklish'...
 Sprowls Small, horned, grey-coloured creatures that sound like and somewhat have the same appearance of Lord Spite. They're seen at the start of the episode, 'The War of the Griffins'. They are said to be as heavy as bowling balls. They have a tuft of hair on the top of their head by the horn that looks like Lord Spite's, that can be mixed in colours of purple, green, yellow, red and blue.
 Spinders/Grintes A fusion of Lord Spite's appearance, (and cowardliness) with a grinder. Created by Deceit, these strange-looking creatures are green with a lighter-shaded tuft of hair around their horn (a horn just like Spite's) and feet, adding a pony-like tail. They're created from grinders and one of Spite's nose hairs.
 Giant Frog-Bat Huge, long-tongued monsters with webbed wings, clawed feet, and a mouth like Nintendo's Birdo. In many episodes, Nestor falls into Frog-Bat guano, which is a purple colour. They have small eyes protruding from its head, and use their tongues to attack.
 Shriek A frilled lizard-like sentient species.  They are called Shrieks because they are known to produce high-pitched shrieks.  Their society considers themselves quite civilized, yet they quickly blame even minor inconveniences on witches, whom they toss down to a pit as a test for.

Locations
 Odyssia - The fictional world or land where the story takes place. Magic and highly sophisticated technology coexist in Odyssia, making it similar to Eternia from He-Man. It also has more than two Suns, which can be seen even at night. Odyssia, like Quest, derives its name from a type of journey, in this case an odyssey.
 Deludium - A town wrought with gambling that Quest says is filled with hoodlums. (Episode 107.1)
 Dust Devil Ravine - Inhabited by Termordites (Episode 108.2)
 Forest of the Unforgiven - Filled with mirror trees. (Episode 107.1)
 Lake of Little - A lake that shrinks anyone who falls into it (Episode 107.2)
 Crater of Mockery- A Volcanic cave with Walls that read the minds of those who pass through it, and uses their thoughts to insult them repeatedly (Episode 106.1)
 Cave of Oddly Big Creatures That Drool - The cave that has the crystal needed to activate the air sword. It is also home to a giant two-headed, pancake-loving monster.
 Effluvium A town built upon a Massive Monster (Heat Vision Included). They have developed a society that is based on a number of crazy laws, so prisoners are in fresh supply to keep the monster from eating/destroying the town.
 The Swamp of Weirds - A swamp where weird things are located.
 The Swamp of Really Icky Things -A swamp where there are really icky things (Episode 112.1)
The Great Great Great Mountain so Great that Great Doesn't Serve it Justice -A large snowy mountain and the location of the Energy Sword

The Swords of Power
 Earth Sword - A sword made of rock and surrounded by green mist, it's activated by plunging it into the ground. The Earth Sword can control the movement of rock and stone around it as well as disintegrate its blade into small fragments, which can be levitated and controlled in midair.
 Fire Sword - A sword made of flames which burn in an upwards direction, it's activated by placing it in the lava in the Chamber of Fire. The Fire Sword can manipulate not only fire but molten lava as well, however, its hilt can sometimes become too hot for the user to hold.
 Water sword - A sword made of water flowing towards the tip, it's activated by placing the Aqua Diamond inside its hilt. The Water Sword, besides allowing the user to unleash water, also possesses the power of temperature adjustment, enabling the user to create ice fields.
 Air Sword - A sword made from a flat helix of air, it's activated by "breaking wind" on the sword. The Air Sword can summon and control air and wind, allowing the user to fly as well as create tornadoes.
 Energy Sword - A sword with patterns resembling those on Way, it's activated by taming a thunder dragon. The Energy Sword, also known as the "Power Sword", can launch burst of electricity as well as bring inanimate objects to life.
 Shattersoul Sword - A sword that will form when the five other swords are combined, it'll allow the Group to defeat Spite and rescue Nestor's parents. Spite wants to obtain it so that he can resurrect Shadowseed. It is possible that it can control all the elements of the 5 swords that initially form it.

Cast
 Ron Pardo as Quest, Graer, Shadowseed, Khaos, additional voices
 Landon Norris as Nestor
  James Rankin as Lord Spite, Kalamity, additional voices
 Kedar Brown  as Gatling, General Ogun, Konfusion, additional voices
 Krystal Meadows as Anna Maht
 Melissa Altro as Way, Deceit

Crew
 Michelle Melanson - Producer
 Ria Westaway - Producer
 Jane Crawford - Producer
 Paul Brown - Director
 Jamie Whitney - Director
 Stephen Sustarsic - Executive Producer, Writer
 Jason Kruse - Creator, Creative Consultant, Writer
 Shannon Eric Denton - Associate Producer, Writer
 Steve Cuden - Writer
 Mark Zaslove - Writer
 Charleen Easton - Writer
 David Silverman - Writer
 Dean Stefan - Writer
 Susan Hart - Voice Director
 Jessie Thomson - Voice Director

Episodes

Season 1 (2008)

Season 2 (2009)

Telecast and home media
World of Quest premiered on March 15, 2008, on Kids' WB on The CW in the U.S. and in Canada on Teletoon on August 10, 2008, as a preview, with regular airings starting on September 1, 2008. The CW4Kids removed it from its schedule after airing the first-season finale "Search For Power" on June 14, 2008.

The series aired on Teletoon in Canada and Cartoon Network in the United Kingdom. It was also being shown on Disney XD in Poland and Latin America, and on Jetix in Central and Eastern Europe. In mid-September 2015, Disney XD Canada was airing repeats of the series. Since the rebranding of Disney XD Canada, from 2015 to 2016, it aired repeats on Family Chrgd.

In March 2010, Cookie Jar Entertainment announced a deal with Mill Creek Entertainment to release their shows, including World of Quest on the home entertainment market in the U.S.

On July 27, 2010, Mill Creek Entertainment released a 10-episode Best-of collection entitled The World of Quest: The Quest Begins on DVD in Region 1 which includes a bonus episode of Super Duper Sumos.

Currently, the show is now streaming on Tubi and available for purchase on Apple TV.

Awards
The series was nominated for Best Children's and Youth Program or Series by the Canadian Film and Television Production Association for their 2009 Indie Awards.

See also
 The World of Quest

References

External links
  at DHX Media
 World of Quest news and info @ Comics2Film

Kids' WB original shows
Disney XD original programming
2000s American animated television series
2000s American comic science fiction television series
2008 American television series debuts
2009 American television series endings
2000s Canadian animated television series
2000s Canadian comic science fiction television series
2008 Canadian television series debuts
2009 Canadian television series endings
American children's animated action television series
American children's animated adventure television series
American children's animated comic science fiction television series
American children's animated science fantasy television series
Canadian children's animated action television series
Canadian children's animated adventure television series
Canadian children's animated comic science fiction television series
Canadian children's animated science fantasy television series
Television series by Cookie Jar Entertainment
CW4Kids original programming
The CW original programming
Teletoon original programming
Jetix original programming
Television shows based on webcomics
English-language television shows
Television series by DHX Media